Bill Bishop is an American author, journalist and social commentator. He co-wrote a book with retired college professor Robert Cushing entitled The Big Sort: Why the Clustering of Like-Minded America is Tearing Us Apart. His ideas have influenced the speeches of former U.S. President Bill Clinton.
He is the co-founder and contributing editor of the Daily Yonder, a blog about rural issues in the United States. Bishop has worked for several newspapers: the Austin American-Statesman, Lexington Herald-Leader, and The Mountain Eagle. He has a degree from Duke University. His wife, Julie Ardery, is also a co-founder and contributing editor of the Daily Yonder. The couple previously owned a newspaper: the Bastrop County Times. They currently live in La Grange, Texas.

Awards
 1996 Gerald Loeb Award for Commentary

References

External links

 The Big Sort
 Daily Yonder

Living people
1953 births
Gerald Loeb Award winners for Columns, Commentary, and Editorials
Duke University alumni
Place of birth missing (living people)
People from La Grange, Texas
Writers from Texas
American male journalists
Austin American-Statesman people
American social commentators